The 2015 Scottish Open Grand Prix was the seventeenth grand prix gold and grand prix tournament of the 2015 BWF Grand Prix Gold and Grand Prix. The tournament was held in Emirates Arena, Glasgow, Scotland November 18–22, 2015 and had a total purse of $50,000.

Men's singles

Seeds

  Hans-Kristian Vittinghus (champion)
  Rajiv Ouseph (final)
  Scott Evans (first round)
  Pablo Abián (first round)
  Raul Must (semifinals)
  Misha Zilberman (second round)
  Vladimir Malkov (second round)
  Emil Holst (quarterfinals)
  Ville Lang (third round)
  Dmytro Zavadsky (first round)
  Anand Pawar (quarterfinals)
  Thomas Rouxel (first round)
  Adrian Dziolko (third round)
  David Obernosterer (quarterfinals)
  Yuhan Tan (quarterfinals)
  Henri Hurskainen (withdrew)

Finals

Top half

Section 1

Section 2

Section 3

Section 4

Bottom half

Section 5

Section 6

Section 7

Section 8

Women's singles

Seeds

  Kirsty Gilmour (final)
  Beatriz Corrales (semifinals)
  Karin Schnaase (first round)
  Line Kjaersfeldt (champion)
  Linda Zetchiri (quarterfinals)
  Chloe Magee (first round)
  Sabrina Jaquet (first round)
  Petya Nedelcheva (first round)

Finals

Top half

Section 1

Section 2

Bottom half

Section 3

Section 4

Men's doubles

Seeds

  Manu Attri / B. Sumeeth Reddy (quarterfinals)
  Marcus Ellis / Chris Langridge (semifinals)
  Adam Cwalina / Przemyslaw Wacha (semifinals)
  Michael Fuchs / Johannes Schoettler (champion)
  Andrew Ellis / Peter Mills (final)
  Phillip Chew / Sattawat Pongnairat (first round)
  Max Schwenger / Josche Zurwonne (withdrew)
  Baptiste Careme / Ronan Labar (quarterfinals)

Finals

Top half

Section 1

Section 2

Bottom half

Section 3

Section 4

Women's doubles

Seeds

  Gabriela Stoeva / Stefani Stoeva (quarterfinals)
  Johanna Goliszewski / Carla Nelte (quarterfinals)
  Heather Olver / Lauren Smith (quarterfinals)
  Ekaterina Bolotova / Evgeniya Kosetskaya (withdrew)

Finals

Top half

Section 1

Section 2

Bottom half

Section 3

Section 4

Mixed doubles

Seeds

  Michael Fuchs / Birgit Michels (quarterfinals)
  Phillip Chew / Jamie Subandhi (first round)
  Ronan Labar / Emilie Lefel (final)
  Sam Magee / Chloe Magee (quarterfinals)
  Robert Mateusiak / Nadiezda Zieba (quarterfinals)
  Vitalij Durkin / Nina Vislova (champion)
  Gaetan Mittelheisser / Audrey Fontaine (semifinals)
  Mathias Christiansen / Lena Grebak (quarterfinals)

Finals

Top half

Section 1

Section 2

Bottom half

Section 3

Section 4

References

2015 in Scottish sport
2010s in Glasgow
Sports competitions in Glasgow
Scotland Open Grand Prix
Scottish Open Grand Prix
Scottish Open (badminton)